Oddemarka is a neighborhood in the city of Kristiansand in Vest-Agder county, Norway.  It is located in the borough of Lund.  The European route E18 highway passes by the neighborhood on the north side.  The neighborhood of Presteheia lies to the north of Oddemarka, Kjøita lies to the west, and Marvika lies to the south.  Oddemarka school is located in the neighborhood.

The population is about 200 inhabitants.

References

Geography of Kristiansand